The Seroe Colorado Lighthouse, known also by the Colorado Point Lighthouse, is located in Seroe Colorado on the southeastern tip of Aruba, and is one of two currently active lighthouses on the island.

It was originally built in 1881 out of stone and wood; however, most of what was built no longer remains.

The light is displayed at the top of a  tower protected by a wire cage.

See also
List of lighthouses in Aruba

References 

Lighthouses completed in 1881
Lighthouses in Aruba
Buildings and structures in San Nicolaas